Bagtyýarlyk may refer to:

Bagtyýarlyk District, a borough of Ashgabat, Turkmenistan
Bagtyýarlyk PSA Territory, a set of natural gas fields in Turkmenistan
Bagtyýarlyk şäherçesi, a town in Mary Province, Turkmenistan